The Young Irelander Rebellion was a failed Irish nationalist uprising led by the Young Ireland movement, part of the wider Revolutions of 1848 that affected most of Europe. It took place on 29 July 1848 at Farranrory, a small settlement about 4.3 km north-northeast of the village of Ballingarry, South Tipperary. After being chased by a force of Young Irelanders and their supporters, an Irish Constabulary unit took refuge in a house and held those inside as hostages. A several-hour gunfight followed, but the rebels fled after a large group of police reinforcements arrived.

It is sometimes called the Famine Rebellion (since it took place during the Great Irish Famine), the Battle of Ballingarry or the Battle of Widow McCormack’s Cabbage Patch.

Background

As with the earlier United Irishmen, who sought to emulate the French Revolution, the Young Irelanders were inspired by Republicanism in America and in Europe.

The year 1848 was a year of revolutions throughout continental Europe. In France, King Louis Philippe was overthrown by the February Revolution and the Second Republic was proclaimed in Paris. This revolution sent political shock waves across Europe, and revolutions broke out in Berlin, Vienna, Rome, Prague, and Budapest. At least temporarily, absolutist governments were replaced by liberal administrations, suffrage was introduced for a portion of the population and elections were held to constituent assemblies to draw up new national constitutions. It was sometimes described as the "springtime of the people".

Ireland was also still reeling from the impact of the Great Famine. The British government's reaction had been too little and too late to prevent the Irish people from suffering great hardship. This delayed reaction was criticized by Irish officials, to little avail.

Inspired by these events and the success of liberal, romantic nationalism on the European mainland and disgusted by Daniel O'Connell's consideration of a renewed alliance with the British Whigs, a group known as Young Ireland broke away from O'Connell's Repeal Association. They took an uncompromising stand for a national Parliament with full legislative and executive powers. At its founding, the Confederation resolved to be based on principles of freedom, tolerance and truth. While the young men did not call for rebellion, neither would they make absolute pledges for peace. Their goal was independence of the Irish nation and they held to any means to achieve that which were consistent with honour, morality and reason. The Young Irelanders, as they had become known, longed to see achieved in Ireland the liberties achieved on the Continent. At the beginning of 1847, they formed an organisation known as The Irish Confederation.

Leaders William Smith O'Brien, Thomas Francis Meagher and Richard O'Gorman led a delegation to Paris to congratulate the new French Republic. Meagher returned to Ireland with a tricolour flag (now the national flag) – a symbol of reconciliation of the green of Catholic Gaelic Ireland with the orange of Protestant Anglo Ireland.

Since most of the continental revolutions were relatively bloodless, O'Brien believed he could attain similar results in Ireland. He hoped to unite Irish landlords and tenants in protest against British rule. The government, however, forced the leaders' hands on 22 July 1848 by announcing the suspension of habeas corpus. This meant they could imprison the Young Irelanders and other opponents on proclamation without trial. Having to choose between armed resistance or an ignominious flight, O'Brien decided that the movement would have to make a stand.

Rebellion

From 23 July to 29 July 1848, O'Brien, Meagher and Dillon raised the standard of revolt as they travelled from County Wexford through County Kilkenny and into County Tipperary. The last great gathering of Young Ireland leaders took place in the village of The Commons on 28 July. The next day, O'Brien was in The Commons where barricades had been erected, near the Commons colliery, to prevent his arrest. His local supporters—miners, tradesmen and small tenant farmers—awaited the arrival of the military and police. As the police from Callan approached the crossroads before The Commons from Ballingarry, they saw barricades in front of them and, thinking discretion the better part of valour, they veered right up the road toward County Kilkenny. The rebels followed them across the fields. Sub-Inspector Trant and his 46 policemen took refuge in a large two-storey farmhouse, taking the five young children in the house as hostages. They barricaded themselves in, pointing their guns from the windows. The house was surrounded by the rebels and a stand-off ensued. Mrs. Margaret McCormack, the owner of the house and mother of the children, demanded to be let into her house, but the police refused and would not release the children. Mrs. McCormack found O'Brien reconnoitering the house from the out-buildings, and asked him what was to become of her children and her house.

O'Brien and Mrs. McCormack went up to the parlour window of the house to speak to the police. Through the window, O'Brien stated, "We are all Irishmen—give up your guns and you are free to go." O'Brien shook hands with some of the police through the window. The initial report to the Lord Lieutenant of Ireland stated that a constable fired the first shot at O'Brien, who was attempting to negotiate. General firing then ensued between the police and the rebels. O'Brien had to be dragged out of the line of fire by James Stephens and Terence Bellew MacManus, both of whom were wounded.

The rebels were incensed that they had been fired upon without provocation, and the shooting went on for a number of hours. During the initial exchange of fire, the rebels at the front of the house—men, women and children—crouched beneath the wall. So great was the pressure of the crowd that one man, Thomas Walsh, was forced to cross from one side of the front gate to the other. As he crossed between the gate piers he was shot dead by the police. During lulls in the shooting, the rebels retreated out of the range of fire. Another man, Patrick McBride, who had been standing at the gable-end of the house when the firing began—and was quite safe where he was—found that his companions had retreated. Jumping up on the wall to run and join them, he was fatally wounded by the police.

It was evident to the rebels that the position of the police was almost impregnable, and a Catholic clergyman of the parish, Rev. Philip Fitzgerald, endeavoured to mediate in the interests of peace. When a party of the Cashel police under Sub-Inspector Cox were seen arriving over Boulea Hill, the rebels attempted to stop them even though they were low on ammunition, but the police continued to advance, firing up the road. It became clear that the police in the house were about to be reinforced and rescued. The rebels then faded away, effectively terminating both the era of Young Ireland and Repeal, but the consequences of their actions would follow them for many years. This event is colloquially known as "The Battle of Widow McCormack's cabbage plot".

Aftermath
John Mitchel, the most committed advocate of revolution, had been arrested early in 1848, then convicted on the purposefully–created charge of treason-felony. He was sentenced to transportation to Bermuda, where he joined other convicts labouring on the construction of the Royal Naval Dockyard on Ireland Island. He was subsequently sent to Van Diemen's Land (in present-day Tasmania, Australia) where he was soon to be joined by other leaders, such as William Smith O'Brien and Thomas Francis Meagher who had both been arrested after Ballingarry. John Blake Dillon escaped to France, as did three of the younger members, James Stephens, John O'Mahony and Michael Doheny. Meagher and John Mitchel (who had been transported there before for political activities) both managed to escape and emigrate to the United States in the early 1850s. They served on opposite sides of the American Civil War: Meagher serving with the Union, for which he recruited and commanded the Irish Brigade, and Mitchel allying himself with the South and living there, sending three sons to fight with the Confederacy.

The McCormack family emigrated to the US about 1853. Since that time, the McCormack house (which was owned by numerous other families after 1848) has always been known locally as the Warhouse. In 2004, the State decided on "Famine Warhouse 1848" as the official name of the house, which had been designated a national heritage monument.

Fenian Brotherhood, Irish Republican Brotherhood
After the collapse of the rebellion, James Stephens and John O'Mahony went to the Continent to avoid arrest. In Paris they supported themselves by teaching and with translation work and planned the next stage of "the fight to overthrow British rule in Ireland". In 1856 O'Mahony went to America and founded the Fenian Brotherhood in 1858. Stephens returned to Ireland and in Dublin on St. Patrick's Day 1858, following an organising tour through the length and breadth of the country, founded the Irish counterpart of the American Fenians, the Irish Republican Brotherhood.

See also
 List of Irish rebellions
 John Blake Dillon
 Terence MacManus
 Thomas Francis Meagher
 William Smith O'Brien
 Father John Kenyon
 Young Ireland

References 

 Ballingarry's Famine Warhouse 1848 site
 Annual Register James Dodsley 1849

Further reading
 The life of John Mitchel,William Dillon, (London, 1888) 2 Vols.
 Life of John Mitchel, P. A. Sillard, James Duffy and Co., Ltd 1908
 John Mitchel, P. S. O'Hegarty,	Maunsel & Company, Ltd 1917
 Irish Mitchel, Seamus MacCall,	Thomas Nelson and Sons Ltd 1938
 John Mitchel First Felon for Ireland, Edited By Brian O'Higgins, Brian O'Higgins 1947
 John Mitchel Noted Irish Lives, Louis J. Walsh, The Talbot Press Ltd 1934
 John Mitchel, A Cause Too Many, Aidan Hegarty, Camlane Press
 Life of John Martin, P. A. Sillard, James Duffy & Co., Ltd 1901.
 The Politics of Irish Literature: from Thomas Davis to W.B. Yeats, Malcolm Brown, Allen & Unwin, 1973.
 Thomas Davis, The Thinker and Teacher,	Arthur Griffith, M.H. Gill & Son 1922.
 Brigadier-General Thomas Francis Meagher His Political and Military Career,Capt. W. F. Lyons, Burns Oates & Washbourne Limited 1869
 Young Ireland and 1848, Dennis Gwynn, Cork University Press 1949.
 Daniel O'Connell The Irish Liberator, Dennis Gwynn, Hutchinson & Co, Ltd.
 O'Connell Davis and the Colleges Bill, Dennis Gwynn, Cork University Press 1948.
 Smith O'Brien And The "Secession", Dennis Gwynn, Cork University Press
 Meagher of The Sword, Edited By Arthur Griffith, M. H. Gill & Son, Ltd. 1916.
 Young Irelander Abroad The Diary of Charles Hart, Edited by Brendan O'Cathaoir, University Press.
 Christine Kinealy. 'Repeal and Revolution. 1848 in Ireland', Manchester University Press, 2009.
 Rossa's Recollections 1838 to 1898, Intro by Sean O'Luing, The Lyons Press 2004.
 Labour in Ireland, James Connolly, Fleet Street 1910.
 The Re-Conquest of Ireland, James Connolly,	Fleet Street 1915.
 Thomas Davis: Essays and Poems, Centenary Memoir, M. H Gill, M.H. Gill & Son, Ltd MCMXLV.
 The Fenians in Context Irish Politics & Society 1848–82, R. V. Comerford, Wolfhound Press 1998
 William Smith O'Brien and the Young Ireland Rebellion of 1848, Robert Sloan, Four Courts Press 2000
 Ireland Her Own, T. A. Jackson, Lawrence & Wishart Ltd 1976.
 Life and Times of Daniel O'Connell, T. C. Luby, Cameron & Ferguson.
 Young Ireland, T. F. O'Sullivan, The Kerryman Ltd. 1945.
 Irish Rebel John Devoy and America's Fight for Irish Freedom, Terry Golway, St. Martin's Griffin 1998.
 Paddy's Lament Ireland 1846–1847 Prelude to Hatred, Thomas Gallagher, Poolbeg 1994.
 The Great Shame, Thomas Keneally, Anchor Books 1999.
 James Fintan Lalor, Thomas, P. O'Neill, Golden Publications 2003.
 Charles Gavan Duffy: Conversations With Carlyle (1892),with Introduction, Stray Thoughts On Young Ireland, by Brendan Clifford, Athol Books, Belfast, . (Pg. 32 Titled, Foster's account Of Young Ireland.)
 Envoi, Taking Leave Of Roy Foster, by Brendan Clifford and Julianne Herlihy, Aubane Historical Society, Cork.
 The Falcon Family, or, Young Ireland'', by M. W. Savage, London, 1845. (An Gorta Mor) Quinnipiac University

1848 in Ireland
Rebellions in Ireland
Revolutions of 1848
Young Ireland
Great Famine (Ireland)
July 1848 events